is a passenger railway station located in the town of Ino, Agawa District, Kōchi Prefecture, Japan. It is operated by JR Shikoku and has the station number "K08".

Lines

Layout
The station, which is unstaffed, consists of a side platform serving a single line. There is no station building, but a weather shelter and an automatic ticket vending machine have been set up on the platform. A ramp leads up to the platform from the access road. A bike shed is provided near the base of the ramp.

Adjacent stations

History
The station opened on 1 October 1964 as a new station on the existing Dosan Line. At this time the station was operated by Japanese Government Railways, later becoming Japanese National Railways (JNR). With the privatization of JNR on 1 April 1987, control of the station passed to JR Shikoku.

Surrounding area
Japan National Route 33
Genba Castle ruins

See also
 List of Railway Stations in Japan

References

External links

 JR Shikoku timetable

Railway stations in Kōchi Prefecture
Railway stations in Japan opened in 1964
Ino, Kōchi